The 1967–68 Football League Cup was the eighth season of the Football League Cup, a knockout competition for England's top 92 football clubs; all League clubs competed except for Manchester United and Tottenham Hotspur. The competition ended with the final on 2 March 1968.

The final was contested by First Division teams Leeds United and Arsenal at Wembley Stadium in London. Leeds United's Terry Cooper scored the only goal of the game, giving Leeds a 1–0 victory.

Calendar
Of the 90 teams, 38 received a bye to the second round (teams ranked 1st–40th in the 1966–67 Football League, excluding 2 teams that did not compete) and the other 52 played in the first round. Semi-finals were two-legged.

First round

Ties

Replays

2nd replays

Second round

Ties

Replays

Third round

Ties

Replays

Fourth round

Ties

Replays

Fifth round

Ties

Replays

Semi-finals

First Leg

Second Leg

Final

The final was held at Wembley Stadium, London on 2 March 1968.

References

External links
									

EFL Cup seasons
Cup, 1967–68